Shakun is both a surname and a given name. Notable people with the name include:

Shakun Batra (born 1983), Indian film director and screenwriter
Anatoliy Shakun (born 1948), Soviet football midfielder and coach